Kevin Reginald Westgarth (born February 7, 1984) is a former Canadian professional ice hockey forward who played five seasons in the National Hockey League (NHL) for the Los Angeles Kings, Carolina Hurricanes, and Calgary Flames. Westgarth mainly played as an enforcer, As evidenced by his NHL career statistics of only 16 points and 266 penalty minutes in 169 games.

Playing career

College
Leading his collegiate Princeton Tigers in penalty minutes, with 48 as a freshman during the 2003-2004 season, Kevin Westgarth established his reputation as a bruiser. He finished his career at Princeton with 130 penalty minutes and 60 points in 116 games, and spent three of his four seasons alongside his brother, Brett. After his senior season, Westgarth was signed as an unrestricted free agent with the Los Angeles Kings on March 16, 2007.

Professional
Westgarth made his professional debut on March 18, 2007, just two days after signing with the Kings, for their AHL affiliate, the Manchester Monarchs, against the Providence Bruins. In just 14 games in 2007, Westgarth accumulated 44 penalty minutes and three points.

During his first full season in Manchester, 2007–2008, Westgarth was second among all AHL rookies in penalty minutes with 191, and led all rookies with 25 major penalties. Westgarth made his NHL debut for the Kings on January 20, 2009 logging 4:39 of ice-time on the road against the Minnesota Wild. Westgarth was recalled from Manchester twice during the season. In his first game back with Manchester on January 23, Westgarth fought Garrett Klotz of the Philadelphia Phantoms, forcing Klotz to leave the ice on a stretcher after suffering seizures following multiple punches to the face from Westgarth. 

Westgarth's best season in the AHL came in the 2009-2010 season as the forward scored 11 goals and tallied 25 points in 76 games, as just one of seven players in the AHL to have 25 points and more than 150 penalty minutes during the season.

Los Angeles Kings 
Westgarth's strong campaign earned him a roster spot with the Kings in the fall of 2010, as the enforcer for head coach Terry Murray. Westgarth's first fight of the preseason resulted in facial fractures for Colorado Avalanche winger David Koci on September 22. Through 30 games, Westgarth led the Kings in penalty minutes with 59, after a number of fights with fellow NHL enforcers, such as John Scott of the Chicago Blackhawks. Late in Game 4 in the playoffs against the San Jose Sharks, Westgarth was ejected with a game misconduct for charging.

During the 2011–12 season, Westgarth scored his first NHL goal against Kari Lehtonen in a 3-2 overtime loss to the Dallas Stars on November 23, 2011. On February 16, 2012, Westgarth suffered a hand injury, placing him on the long term injury list for the remainder of the season. With the Kings franchise subsequently earning their first Stanley Cup in the club's forty-five-year history, and despite only playing in 25 regular season games, Westgarth was acknowledged as a Stanley Cup winner and had his name engraved on the cup.

Carolina Hurricanes
During the 2012-13 NHL lockout, Westgarth stayed at his offseason home in North Carolina and practiced with several members of the Carolina Hurricanes while participating in NHLPA negotiations with the league on a new collective bargaining agreement. Upon ratification of the new agreement, the Kings promptly traded him to the Hurricanes for Anthony Stewart, a 2013 fourth-round pick and a 2014 sixth-round pick on January 13, 2013.

Calgary Flames

On December 30, 2013, Westgarth was traded by the Hurricanes to the Calgary Flames in exchange for Greg Nemisz. In the remainder of the 2013–14 season, Westgarth enjoyed his most productive period of his NHL career, in scoring a career high 4 goals and 7 points in 36 games.

With the Flames opting to not tender Westgarth a new offer, he was released to free agency at season's end. Without a contract heading into the 2014–15 season, Westgarth accepted an invitation to try out at the Edmonton Oilers training camp. On October 5, 2014, he was released from the Oilers pre-season roster and later opted to sign a one-year contract with Northern Irish club, the Belfast Giants of the EIHL on October 30, 2014.

Career statistics

Awards and honours

Personal life 
Kevin is married to Meagan Westgarth (née Cowher), daughter of former NFL head coach Bill Cowher. They met while attending Princeton University, where Meaghan played on the varsity basketball team. They were wed in 2011, and make their home in Brooklyn, New York. Through his marriage, Westgarth is the brother-in-law of former Atlanta Hawks player, Ryan Kelly.

References

External links

1984 births
Living people
Calgary Flames players
Canadian ice hockey centres
Carolina Hurricanes players
Ice hockey people from Ontario
Los Angeles Kings players
Manchester Monarchs (AHL) players
People from Amherstburg, Ontario
Princeton Tigers men's ice hockey players
Stanley Cup champions
Belfast Giants players
Undrafted National Hockey League players
Canadian expatriate ice hockey players in Northern Ireland
Canadian sportspeople of Irish descent
Canadian expatriate ice hockey players in the United States